Otaria was the name of at least two ships of the Italian Navy and may refer to:

 , a  launched in 1905 and discarded in 1918.
 , a  initially ordered by Portugal as Espadarte but cancelled before launch and acquired by Italy. She was launched in 1935 and discarded in 1948.

Italian Navy ship names